This is a list of schools in Sabah, Malaysia. Schools are categorised according to their types and education districts (for schools which do not fall under the direct rule of Ministry of Education) and is arranged alphabetically in Malay language. Note that only some notable schools are abbreviated. 

For the purpose of this list: 

 KV stands for Kolej Vokasional (vocational college); 
 SJK (C) stands for Sekolah Jenis Kebangsaan Cina (Chinese type primary school); 
 SK stands for Sekolah Kebangsaan (primary school); 
 SM(K) stands for Sekolah Menengah (Kebangsaan) (secondary school); and 
 SMKA stands for Sekolah Menengah Kebangsaan Agama (Islamic secondary school). 
SRS stands for Sekolah Rendah Swasta (private primary school)

Specific schools

Chinese independent schools 

Kian Kok Middle School, Kota Kinabalu
Sabah Tshung Tsing Secondary School, Kota Kinabalu
Sabah Chinese High School, Tawau
Yu Yuan Secondary School, Sandakan

Fully residential schools 

 SM Sains Lahad Datu (SEMSALD)
SM Sains Sabah, Tuaran (SMESH)

Islamic secondary schools 

 SM Agama al-Irsyadiah Marakau, Ranau (SMAIM)
 SMKA Keningau (SEMAKEN)
SMKA Kota Kinabalu (SMKAKK)
 SMKA Limauan, Papar (SMALNIS)
 SMKA Mohamad Ali, Ranau (SEMEKAR)
SMKA Tun Ahmadshah, Kota Kinabalu (SMKA TUNAS)
 SMKA Tun Datu Mustapha, Papar (SMKA TDM)
 SMKA Tun Juhar, Sandakan (SMATJU)
 SMKA Tun Said, Kota Belud (SMATS KB)
 SMKA Tun Sakaran, Semporna (SMATS Semporna)
 SMU Islamiah, Tawau (SMIT)

SDA Mission schools 

 SMA Tamparuli (SASS)
 SMA Goshen, Kota Marudu (GASS)
 SRA Tamparuli
 SRA Goshen, Kota Marudu
 SRA Tenghilan
 SRA Gaur, Kota Belud
 SRA Rangalau, Kota Belud
 SRA Kelawat, Kota Belud
 SRA Sungoi
 SRA Tagaroh, Kota Marudu
 SRA Damai, Kota Marudu
 SRA Tambuluran, Kota Marudu
 SRA Marabau
 SRA Bambangan

Private schools 

Maktab Nasional, Likas (MN)
 SRS Datuk Simon Fung, Likas (SRSDSF)
 Seri Insan Borneo School, Kota Kinabalu
 Yuet Ching Private School, Kota Kinabalu

International Schools 

 Charis International School, Tawau
 Kinabalu International School, Kota Kinabalu,
 Vision International School, Tawau

Technical and vocational colleges 

 KV Beaufort
 KV Lahad Datu
 KV Likas, Kota Kinabalu
 KV Keningau
 KV Keningau 2
 KV Kudat
 KV Sandakan
 KV Tawau

Special education schools 

 SK Pendidikan Khas Kota Kinabalu, Tuaran
 SK Pendidikan Khas Tuaran, Putatan

Sport schools 

 Sekolah Sukan Malaysia Sabah, Kota Kinabalu

Public schools

Secondary education: Sekolah Menengah Kebangsaan (SMK)

Beaufort 
Primary schools:
 SJK (C) Kung Ming (1)
SJK (C) Lian Hwa
SJK (C) Pei Yin
SK Bandau
SK Bangkalalak
SK Batandok
SK Bentuka
SK Biah Batu 65
SK Binsulok
SK Bukau
SK Gadong
SK Garama
SK Jabang
SK Kabajang
SK Karangan
SK Kampung Bambangan
SK Kampung Brunei
SK Kebatu
SK Kebulu
SK Kepawa
SK Kota Klias
SK Klias Baru
SK Klias Kecil
SK Kukuro
SK Lago
SK Ladang Lumadan
SK Lajau
SK Lembah Poring
SK Lingkungan
SK Luagan
SK Lubok
SK Lumat
SK Lupak
SK Maraba
SK Mempagar
SK Batu 60
SK Nukahan
SK Padas Damit
SK Pekan Membakut
SK Pekan Beaufort
SK Pengiran Jaya Pimping
SK Pintas
SK Rancangan Klias
SK Saga-Saga
SK Sinoko
SK St. John
SK St. Paul
SK St. Patrick
SK Suasa
SK Tahak
SK Takuli
SK Tamalang
SK Tiong Baru
SK Weston

Secondary schools:
 SMK Beaufort
 SMK Beaufort II
 SMK Beaufort III
 SMK Gadong
 SMK Kota Klias
 SMK Membakut
 SMK Membakut II
 SMK St. Patrick, Membakut
 SMK St. Paul, Beaufort
 SMK St. John, Beaufort
 SMK Weston

Keningau 
Primary schools:
 SJK (C) Cheng Ming
SJK (C) Yuk Kong
SJK (C) Yuk Yin
SK Ambual
SK Ansip
SK Apin-Apin
SK Banjar
SK Batu Lunguyan
SK Binuwou Tengah
SK Binakaan
SK Binanon
SK Binaong
SK Bingkor
SK Bonor
SK Bulu Silou
SK Bunang Sook
SK Bundu Apin-Apin
SK Bunga Raya
SK Bunsit
SK Dalit
SK Delayan Tulid
SK Gaulan
SK Inandung
SK Kabatang Baru
SK Kalampun
SK Kampung Baru
SK Kampung Biah
SK Kampung Keningau
SK Karamatoi
SK Kawakaan
SK Jaya Baru
SK Kampung Beriawa Ulu
SK Kapayan Baru
SK Kebulu
SK Kuala Kahaba
SK Liau Apin-Apin
SK Lintuhun Baru
SK Luagan
SK Magatang
SK Malaing
SK Malima
SK Mamagun
SK Mansiat
SK Membulu
SK Menawo
SK Merampong
SK Meninipir
SK Nandagan
SK Nangkawangan
SK Pangas
SK Pasir Puteh
SK Patikang Laut
SK Pekan Keningau
SK Pekan Keningau II
SK Penagatan
SK Pohon Batu
SK Rancangan Belia Tiulon
SK Rancangan Biah
SK Senagang
SK Simbuan Tulid
SK Sinaron Tengah
SK Sinua
SK Sinulihan Baru
SK Sodomon
SK Sook
SK St. Francis Xavier
SK St. James Apin-Apin
SK Tuarid Taud
SK Tulid
SK Ulu Liawan
SK Ulu Senagang

Secondary schools:
 SM St. Francis Xavier
 SMK Apin-Apin
 SMK Bingkor
 SMK Gunsanad
 SMK Gunsanad II
 SMK Keningau
 SMK Keningau II
 SMK Ken Hwa
 SMK Sook
 SMK Tulid

Kinabatangan 
Primary schools:
 SK Abai
 SK Balat
 SK Batu Puteh
 SK Bilit
 SK Buang Sayang
 SK Bukit Garam
 SK Bukit Garam II
 SK Desa Permai
 SK Jaya Baru
 SK Kampung Suan Lamba
 SK Kota Kinabatangan
 SK Kuala Suan Lamba
 SK Kuamut
 SK Ladang Bode Kretam
 SK Ladang Sungai Bendera
 SK Ladang Tomanggong
 SK Litang
 SK Paris
 SK Paris 3
 SK Rancangan Suan Lamba
 SK Sandau
 SK Sangau
 SK Sapagaya
 SK Sentosa Jaya
 SK Sinar Jaya
 SK Singgah Manis
 SK Sri Ganda
 SK Sukau
 SK Sungai Lokan
 SK Tidung Tabin
 SK Tundun Bohangin

Secondary schools:
 SMK Bukit Garam
 SMK Bukit Garam II
 SMK Paris
 SMK Sukau

Kota Belud 
Primary schools:
 SJK (C) Chung Hwa
 SK Ambong
 SK Bangkahak Baru
 SK Dalas
 SK Dudar
 SK Gensurai
 SK Jawi-Jawi
 SK Keguraan
 SK Labuan
 SK Kaung
 SK Kebayau
 SK Kelawat
 SK Kesapang
 SK Kiau
 SK Kinasaraban
 SK Kuala Abai
 SK Kulambai
 SK Lasau Podi
 SK Lasau Tintapon
 SK Melangkap
 SK Mengkulat
 SK Menunggui
 SK Nahaba
 SK Nanamun
 SK Narinang
 SK Pandasan
 SK Pangkalan Abai
 SK Pekan Kota Belud
 SK Peladok
 SK Piasau
 SK Pinolobu
 SK Pituru
 SK Podos
 SK Pulau Mantanani
 SK Rampayan Ulu
 SK Rangalau
 SK Rosok
 SK Sarang
 SK Sayap
 SK Sembirai
 SK Suang Punggor
 SK St. Edmund
 SK Taburan
 SK Taginambur
 SK Tamau
 SK Tambatuan
 SK Tambulian
 SK Tampasuk I
 SK Tampasuk II
 SK Tamu Darat
 SK Tarintidon
 SK Tengkurus
 SK Taun Gusi
 SK Timbang
 SK Timbang Dayang
 SK Tuguson
 SK Ulu Kukut

Secondary schools:
 SMK Arshad
 SMK Narinang
 SMK Pekan Kota Belud
 SMK Pekan II Kota Belud
 SMK Tambulion
 SMK Taun Gusi
 SMK Usukan

Kota Kinabalu 
Primary schools:
 SJK (C) Che Hwa Kolombong
 SJK (C) Chung Hwa Likas
 SJK (C) Chung Hwa Kampung Air
 SJK (C) Good Shepherd, Manggatal
 SJK (C) Lok Yuk Likas
 SJK (C) Lok Yuk Manggatal
 SJK (C) Shan Tao
 SJK (C) St. James
 SJK (C) St. Peter Telipok
 SJK (C) Yick Nam
 SK Api-Api
 SK Babagon Toki
 SK Bantayan
 SK Bukit Padang
 SK Darau
 SK Gantisan
 SK Gudon
 SK Inanam II
 SK Inanam Laut
 SK Kebagu
 SK Kebayau
 SK Keronggu
 SK Kitobu
 SK Kokol
 SK Kolombong
 SK Lapasan
 SK Likas
 SK Lok Yuk Inanam
 SK Lok Yuk Likas
 SK Luyang
 SK Malawa
 SK Mutiara
 SK Natai
 SK Pangkalan TLDM Kota Kinabalu
 SK Pengiran Siti Hafsah
 SK Pomotodon
 SK Poring-Poring
 SK Pulau Sepanggar
 SK Pulau Gaya
 SK Rampayan
 SK Ruminding
 SK Sacred Heart
 SK Sembulan
 SK Sri Gaya
 SK St. Agnes
 SK St. Catherine
 SK St. Francis Convent
 SK Stella Maris
 SK Talungan
 SK Tampulan
 SK Tanjung Aru I
 SK Tanjung Aru II
 SK Tobobon
 SK Tombongon
 SK Unggun
 SK (Cina) Anglo-Chinese
Secondary schools:
 SM Maktab Sabah
 SMK All Saints
 SMK Bandaraya
 SMK Inanam
 SMK Kolombong
 SM La Salle
 SMK Lok Yuk Likas
 SMK Likas
 SMK Perempuan Likas
 SMK Pulau Gaya
 SMK Taman Tun Fuad
 SMK Tinggi Kota Kinabalu
 SMK Tobobon
 SMK SANZAC
 SMK Shan Tao
 SMK St. Francis Convent
 SMK St. Peter Telipok
 SM Stella Maris
Sixth form college:
 Kolej Tingkatan Enam Kota Kinabalu

Kota Marudu 
Primary schools:
 SJK (C) Khoi Ming
 SK Bengkongan
 SK Bintasan
 SK Gana
 SK Koromoko
 SK Kota Marudu II
 SK Lampada
 SK Langkon
 SK Magandai
 SK Mangaris
 SK Mangin
 SK Marak-Parak
 SK Masalog
 SK Melangkap
 SK Ongkilan
 SK Panaitan
 SK Pekan Kota Marudu
 SK Popok
 SK Ranau
 SK Samparita
 SK Sampir
 SK Simpangan
 SK Sunsui
 SK Tagaroh
 SK Tagibang
 SK Talantang
 SK Tandek
 SK Tanjung Batu
 SK Taritipan
 SK Temuno Teringai Darat
 SK Tigaman
 SK Timbang Batu
 SK Tumunda Salimandut

Secondary schools:
 SMK Bandau
 SMK Bengkongan
 SMK Kota Marudu I
 SMK Kota Marudu II
 SMK Langkon
 SMK Tandek

Kuala Penyu 
Primary schools:
 SJK (C) Chung Hwa
 SJK (C) Phui Hwa
 SK Batu Linting
 SK Berangkok
 SK Janang
 SK Kekapor
 SK Kilugus
 SK Lambidan
 SK Mansud
 SK Melikai
 SK Menumpang
 SK Menunggang
 SK Palu-Palu
 SK Pekan Kuala Penyu
 SK Pekan Menumbok
 SK Rimbaan
 SK Sangkabok
 SK Sinapokan
 SK St. Augustine
 SK St. Joseph
 SK St. Peter Bundu
 SK St. Stephen
 SK Tanjung Aru
 SK Tempurong
 SK Tenambak

Secondary schools:
 SMK Kuala Penyu
 SMK Menumbok
 SMK Pekan Kuala Penyu
 SMK St. Peter Bundu

Kudat 
Primary schools:
 SJK (C) Hwa Lian
 SJK (C) Lok Yuk Batu 1
 SJK (C) Lok Yuk Pinangsoo
 SJK (C) Our Lady Immaculate
 SJK (C) Sacred Heart Tajau
 SJK (C) St. Peter
 SJK (C) Yuk Hwa Tamalang
 SK Balambangan Banggi
 SK Bangau
 SK Barambangon
 SK Batu Layar
 SK Bingolon
 SK Dampirit
 SK Dogoton
 SK Dualog
 SK Garau
 SK Gumandang
 SK Indarason Laut
 SK Kampung Minyak
 SK Kapitangan
 SK Karakit Banggi
 SK Lajong
 SK Laksian
 SK Lampaki
 SK Landung Ayang
 SK Limau-Limauan
 SK Limbuak
 SK Lodung
 SK Lok Yuk Batu 1
 SK Lok Yuk Sikuati
 SK Lok Yuk Tamalang
 SK Lokoton
 SK Loktohog Banggi
 SK Lotong
 SK Matunggong
 SK Muhibbah
 SK Nangka
 SK Padang
 SK Palak
 SK Panudahan
 SK Parapat Darat
 SK Pata
 SK Pekan Kudat II
 SK Perapat Laut
 SK Pinawantai
 SK Pulau Tigabu
 SK Sabur
 SK Sebayan
 SK Semayan Banggi
 SK Sikuati
 SK St. James
 SK Suangpai
 SK Tanjung Manawali
 SK Terongkongan
 SK Tiga Papan
 SK Tinangol
 SK Tun Datu Haji Mustapha

Secondary schools:
 SM Pei Tsin
 SM St. Peter
 SMK Abdul Rahim
 SMK Abdul Rahim II
 SMK Banggi
 SMK Kudat
 SMK Kudat II
 SMK Matunggong
 SMK Pinawantai
 SMK Sikuati
 SMK Sikuati II

Kunak 
Primary schools:
 SJK (C) Pai Sheng
 SK Gading-Gading
 SK Kampung Selamat
 SK Kunak I
 SK Kunak II
 SK Kunak Jaya
 SK Ladang Binuang
 SK Ladang Giram
 SK Lormalong
 SK Madai
 SK Mostyn
 SK Pangi
 SK Skim Kokos
 SK Tanjung Keramat
 SK Tun Fuad

Secondary schools:
 SMK Madai
 SMK Kunak
 SMK Kunak Jaya

Labuk–Sugut 
Primary schools:
 SK Abuan
 SK Balaban Jaya
 SK Basai Baru
 SK Bawang
 SK Binsulung
 SK Botition
 SK Bukit Besi
 SK Golong
 SK Holy Cross
 SK Jambongan
 SK Jaya Bakti
 SK Kabuluh
 SK Keniogan
 SK Kolapis
 SK Ladang Sabapalm
 SK Lidong
 SK Limau-Limau
 SK Lingkabau
 SK Lubang Buaya
 SK Maidan
 SK Malalin
 SK Matanggal Beluran
 SK Monopod
 SK Moynod
 SK Nangoh
 SK Obah
 SK Pamol
 SK Pantai Boring
 SK Pekan Beluran
 SK Perancangan
 SK Pinangkau
 SK Semawang
 SK Seri Pagi
 SK Simpangan
 SK Sualok
 SK Sungai Nafas
 SK Sungai Nangka
 SK Sungai Sapi
 SK Sungai-Sungai
 SK Tagas-Tagas
 SK Tampat
 SK Tangkarason
 SK Tanjung Nipis
 SK Terusan Sugut
 SK Tetabuan
 SK Ulu Muanad

Secondary schools:
 SMK Balaban Jaya, Beluran
 SMK Beluran
 SMK Beluran II
 SMK Pamol, Beluran
 SMK Terusan Sugut, Beluran

Lahad Datu 
Primary schools:
 SJK (C) Chee Vun
 SJK (C) Kiau Shing
 SJK (C) Siew Ching
 SJK (C) Sin Wah
 SJK (C) Yuk Choi
 SK Amalania
 SK Aakapit
 SK Bangingod
 SK Batu 6 1/2 Segama
 SK Bikang
 SK Binuang
 SK Bukit Balacon
 SK Cenderawasih
 SK Fajar Harapan
 SK Jeroco
 SK Kennedy Bay
 SK Lahad Datu II
 SK Lahad Datu III
 SK Lahad Datu IV
 SK Lok Buani
 SK Payang
 SK Pekan Lahad Datu
 SK Permai
 SK Sabah Cocoa
 SK Sahabat 16
 SK Sahabat 4
 SK Sahabat 2
 SK Sepagaya
 SK Silabukan
 SK Silam
 SK Sri Darun
 SK Sri Pantai
 SK St. Dominic
 SK St. Stephens
 SK Tambisan
 SK Tanjong Paras
 SK Tanjung Labian
 SK Tawaiyari
 SK Telisai
 SK Terusan
 SK Tungku
 SK Ulu Tungku
 SK Unico Desa

Secondary schools:
 SMK Agaseh
 SMK Desa Kencana
 SMK Sepagaya
 SMK Segama
 SMK Silabukan
 SMK St. Dominic
 SMK Tungku

Papar 
Primary schools:
 SJK (C) Anglo Chinese
 SJK (C) Bong Hwa
 SJK (C) Cheng Hwa
 SJK (C) Cheng Ming
 SJK (C) Hwa Yin Rampazan
 SJK (C) Kin Kiau
 SJK (C) Sen Ming
 SJK (C) St. Joseph
 SJK (C) Tung Shan
 SK Belatik
 SK Benoni
 SK Buang Sayang
 SK Daingin
 SK Gana
 SK Kaiduan
 SK Kambizaan
 SK Kawang
 SK Kayau
 SK Kelanahan
 SK Kelatuan
 SK Kimanis
 SK Kogopon
 SK Kuala Papar
 SK Langkawit
 SK Limputong
 SK Lingan
 SK Mandahan
 SK Mandalipau
 SK Mook
 SK Nyaris-Nyaris
 SK Our Lady
 SK Padawan Besar
 SK Pantai Manis
 SK Pekan Bongawan
 SK Pekan Kimanis
 SK Pekan Kinarut
 SK Pekan Papar
 SK Pengalat Besar
 SK Pengalat Kecil
 SK Rampazan
 SK Sabandil
 SK Sacred Heart Kampung Biau
 SK St. Joseph
 SK St. Mary
 SK Sumbiling
 SK Surati
 SK Tampasak
 SK Tanaki
 SK Ulu Lumagar
 SK Viging Ulu

Secondary schools:
 SM St. Joseph
 SM St. Mary
 SMK Benoni
 SMK Bongawan
 SMK Kinarut
 SMK Majakir
 SMK Takis

Penampang 
Primary schools:
 SJK (C) Hwa Shiong
 SJK (C) Yue Min
 SK Babagon
 SK Bahang
 SK Buayan
 SK Buit Hill
 SK Kampung Contoh
 SK Kem Lok Kawi
 SK Kibabaig
 SK Kipovo
 SK Longkogungon
 SK Moyog
 SK Pekan Putatan
 SK Penampang
 SK Petagas
 SK Putaton Inobong
 SK Puun Tonoh
 SK St. Aloysius Limbanak
 SK St. Anthony
 SK St. Joseph
 SK St. Paul Kolopis
 SK Sugud
 SK Tampasak Togudon
 SK Tansau
 SK Terian
 SK Tombovo

Secondary schools:
SM St. Michael
SMK Bahang
SMK Datuk Peter Mojuntin
 SMK Limbanak
 SMK Putatan
 SMK Tansau

Pensiangan 
Primary schools:
 SK Babalitan
 SK Kampung Bahagia
 SK Kampung Enam
 SK Kebu Baru
 SK Kuala Salong
 SK Labang
 SK Layon
 SK Longongon
 SK Lotong
 SK Pandiwan
 SK Pekan Nabawan
 SK Pekan Pensiangan
 SK Pementerian
 SK Pengaraan
 SK Penontomon
 SK Salarom
 SK Saliku
 SK Saliliran
 SK Salinatan
 SK Sapulut
 SK Sasandukon
 SK Sibangali
 SK Simatuoh
 SK Tampusison
 SK Tetagas
 SK Tinanduk
 SK Ulu Mosopoh

Secondary schools:
SMK Nabawan
SMK Nabawan II
SMK Sapulut

Pitas 
Primary schools:
 SK Bawang
 SK Bawing
 SK Bongkol
 SK Dallas
 SK Dandun
 SK Datong
 SK Kanibongan
 SK Kasagaan
 SK Kibubuk
 SK Kusilad
 SK Liu
 SK Malubang
 SK Mandurian
 SK Manggis
 SK Mangkapon
 SK Mapan-Mapan
 SK Maringgan
 SK Nibang
 SK Pandan Mandamai
 SK Pantai
 SK Pekan Pitas
 SK Pekan Pitas II
 SK Pinapak
 SK Pinggan-Pinggan
 SK Rosob
 SK Rukom
 SK Salimpodon Darat
 SK Senaja
 SK Sosop
 SK Telaga

Secondary schools:
 SMK Bongkol
 SMK Kanibongan
 SMK Pinggan-Pinggan
 SMK Pitas
 SMK Pitas II
 SMK Telaga

Ranau 
Primary schools:
 SJK (C) Pai Wen
 SK Badukan
 SK Bongkud
 SK Bundu Tuhan
 SK Don Bosco
 SK Gana-Gana
 SK Gusi
 SK Kaingaran
 SK Kampung Libang
 SK Kananapon
 SK Kandawayon
 SK Karagasan
 SK Kauluan
 SK Kawiyan Sugut
 SK Kemburungoh
 SK Kepangian
 SK Keranaan
 SK Kilimu
 SK Kimondou
 SK Kinapulidan
 SK Kinasaraban
 SK Kinirasan
 SK Kirokot
 SK Kituntul
 SK Kundasang
 SK Langsat
 SK Lipasu
 SK Lohan
 SK Longut
 SK Malinsau
 SK Mangkapoh
 SK Marakau
 SK Matupang
 SK Maukab
 SK Mesilou
 SK Miruru
 SK Mohimboyon
 SK Nalapak
 SK Nampasan
 SK Napong
 SK Naradan
 SK Narawang
 SK Nukakatan
 SK Nunuk Ragang
 SK Paginatan
 SK Pahu Himbaan
 SK Paus
 SK Pekan II Ranau
 SK Pekan Ranau
 SK Perancangan
 SK Pinausuk
 SK Pinawantai
 SK Poring
 SK Randagong
 SK Ratau
 SK Sagiban
 SK Sagindai
 SK Sri Gabungan
 SK St. Benedict
 SK Tagudon Lama
 SK Tampios
 SK Tarawas
 SK Tiang
 SK Tibabar
 SK Timbua
 SK Tinanom
 SK Toboh
 SK Togop Darat
 SK Tongou
 SK Tudan
 SK Waang

Secondary schools:
 SMK Bundu Tuhan
 SMK Kemburongoh
 SMK Kundasang
 SMK Lohan
 SMK Mat Salleh
 SMK Matupang Jaya
 SMK Ranau
 SMK Timbua
 SMK Ulu Sugut

Sandakan 

 SM Convent St. Cecilia
 SM St. Mary
 SM St. Mike
 SM Yu Yuan
 SMK Batu Sapi
 SMK Berhala Darat
 SMK Elopura
 SMK Elopura 2
 SMK Merpati
 SMK Muhibbah
 SMK Pamol
 SMK Perempuan Sandakan
 SMK Sandakan
 SMK Sandakan 2
 SMK Simpangan
 SMK Taman Fajar

Semporna 

 SMK Datuk Haji Panglima Jakarullah
 SMK Datuk Panglima Abdullah
 SMK Bugaya
 SMK Bugaya 2
 SMK Bum-Bum
 SMK Kabogan
 SMK Kabogan 2
 SMK Tagasan

Sipitang 

 SMK Padang Berampah
 SMK Pengiran Omar
 SMK Pengiran Omar II
SMK Sindumin

Tambunan 

 SM St. Martin Tampasak
 SMK Desa Wawasan
 SMK Nambayan
 SMK Tambunan

Tawau 

 SM Holy Trinity
 SM St. Patrick
 SM Convent St. Ursula
 SMK Abaka
 SMK Balung
 SMK Balung Bestari
 SMK Jalan Apas
 SMK Jambatan Putih
 SMK Kabota
 SMK Kalabakan
 SMK Kinabutan
 SMK Kuhara
 SMK Merotai Besar
 SMK Tawau
 SMK Umas-Umas
 SMK Wallace Bay

Tenom 

 SMK Chinta Mata
 SMK Chung Hwa
 SMK Entabuan
 SMK Kemabong
 SMK St. Anthony
 SMK Tenom

Tongod 

 SMK Entilibon
 SMK Penangah
 SMK Telupid
 SMK Tongod
 SMK Ulu Sapi

Tuaran 
Primary schools:
 Sekolah Agama Suria, Tuaran
 SJK (C) Chen Sin, Tuaran
 SJK (C) Chung Hwa Tenghilan
 SJK (C) Chung Hwa Tamparuli
 SJK (C) Kok Wah Talibong, Tamparuli
 SJK (C) St. Philip, Tamparuli
 SK Bantayan, Tamparuli
 SK Baru-Baru, Tuaran
 SK Bawang, Tamparuli
 SK Berungis, Tuaran
 SK Bolong, Tuaran
 SK Bongol, Tamparuli
 SK Bundung, Tamparuli
 SK Bundu Tohuri, Tamparuli
 SK Bungalio, Tamparuli
 SK Gayang, Tuaran
 SK Gayaratau, Tamparuli
 SK Giok, Kiulu
 SK Gontung, Tamparuli
 SK Guakon Baru, Tamparuli
 SK Kauluan, Tamparuli
 SK Kayangat, Tamparuli
 SK Kelawat, Tamparuli
 SK Kindu, Tuaran
 SK Kitapol, Tamparuli
 SK Koporingan, Tamparuli
 SK Laputong, Tamparuli
 SK Laya-Laya, Tuaran
 SK Lingga Baru, Tamparuli
 SK Linungkuan, Tamparuli
 SK Lokos, Kiulu
 SK Lokub, Kiulu
 SK Lok Yuk Telipok
 SK Kapa, Tamparuli
 SK Malangang Baru, Kiulu
 SK Mantob, Tamparuli
 SK Mengkabong, Tuaran
 SK Nongkolud, Tuaran
 SK Pahu, Tamparuli
 SK Pekan Kiulu
 SK Pekan Tamparuli
 SK Pekan Telipok
 SK Pekan Tenghilan
 SK Pekan Tuaran
 SK Penimbawan, Tuaran
 SK Poring, Tamparuli
 SK Pukak, Tamparuli
 SK Rangalau Baru, Kiulu
 SK Rangalau Lama, Kiulu
 SK Rugading, Tuaran
 SK Rungus, Tamparuli
 SK Rungus Nahaba, Tamparuli
 SK Sambah, Tenghilan
 SK Saradan, Tenghilan
 SK Selupoh, Tuaran
 SK Serusup, Tuaran
 SK Sinulihan, Tamparuli
 SK St. John, Tuaran
 SK Sungai Damit, Tamparuli
 SK Sungoi, Kiulu
 SK Taginambur, Tamparuli
 SK Tambalang, Tuaran
 SK Tambulaong, Tuaran
 SK Termunong, Tuaran
 SK Tinambak, Tamparuli
 SK Tiong Perungusan, Tamparuli
 SK Togop, Tamparuli
 SK Tombongon, Tamparuli
 SK Tomis, Tamparuli
 SK Topokon, Tamparuli
 SK Tudan, Kiulu
 SK Wangkod, Tamparuli
 SK Wasai, Kiulu

Secondary schools:
 SM St. James, Tenghilan
 SM St. John, Tuaran
 SMK Badin, Tuaran
 SMK Pekan Telipok
 SMK Taman Ria, Tuaran
 SMK Tamparuli
 SMK Tenghilan
 SMK Tun Fuad Stephens, Kiulu
 SMK Seri Nangka, Tuaran
 SMK Sungai Damit, Tamparuli

References

See also 
 Education in Malaysia

Sabah